Theridion quadratum, is a species of spider of the genus Theridion. It is found only in Sri Lanka and Sumatra.

See also 
 List of Theridiidae species

References 

Theridiidae
Spiders of Asia
Spiders described in 1882